Silvino Artemio Barsana Agudo (September 12, 1917 – December 17, 2010), also known as S.B. or Binong, was a Filipino businessman, lawyer, World War II veteran, and public servant. He was the governor of Batanes province in the Philippines from 1968 to 1971.

Silvino's early years 

Silvino Barsana Agudo was peacefully born on September 12, 1917, in the northern mainland provincial city of Tuguegarao, Cagayan, Philippines.

Silvino was the third of seven children of Pablo Agudo, a farmer turned tailor who was the ninth of ten children, and Consolacion Castillejos Barsana, was one of the first pre-school / elementary teachers in Ivana, both natives of Ivana, Batanes.

Seven siblings:
Vicente Homobono Agudo (born November 14, 1907; married Benjamina Pango of Ivana, they had one son, Vicente Jr.)
Aurora Elisa Agudo (born April 22, 1915; died single and childless in 1949)
Silvino Artenio Agudo (born September 12, 1917; married Honorata P. Arcilla, they had seven children)
Robustiano "Robust" Federico Agudo (born October 12, 1920; married Teodora "Dory" Villapando, they had eight children)
Ramon Agudo (born September 2, 1922; died single and childless in 1954)
Daz Agudo (born 1923 and died at the age of 5 due to the flu, trancaso)
Soccorro "Corring" Agudo (born in 1925, married to attorney and later Judge Deogracias Aggabao; they had three children. She died in 1960)

Silvino's parents were natives of Ivana but later moved to mainland Luzon because "farming (in Batanes) could not support the local population." Silvino's father, Pablo, fished for arayu tuna and flying fish; he also grew "fertile but small crops" on Mount Matarem including tobacco, corn, and rice, and exported dried fish and dried garlic to Manila.  Consequently, Silvino's father, Pablo, moved to Cagayan province and established a tailor shop in Tuguegarao, Cagayan, the capital of the province. His father's prospering business provided the opportunity for short vacations back to Ivana, Batanes.

Silvino Barsana Agudo's mother, Consolacion Castillejos Barsana, was born December 27, 1882, in Ivana, Batanes. Silvino and his siblings called their mother Nana and father Tata as children until adulthood.  Consolacion was one of the first to be taught English when the Americans came and consequently became a pre-school kindergarten teacher by profession. Her father, Luciano Barsana, served as governor of Batanes.

As a young boy, Silvino would often travel to Batanes for vacations with his father and brothers Robustiano and Ramon. They would go fishing for dibang flying fish and arayu tuna with their father and were there in Batanes during the Japanese construction of the national road including the construction of the landmark 'Payhaysan' found on the road connecting Basco to Mahatao to Ivana.

Consolacion, Silvino's mother was very industrious; besides taking care of six children, she helped her husband's tailoring business and cooked lunch and dinner for the tailor shop staff. Silvino in his memoirs expressed he "never took for granted his mother' difficulties," acknowledging that "giving birth in those years was an unbearable human sacrifice." Silvino cared for his mother who suffered from tuberculosis due to "little rest and sleep." Silvino was a constant companion, going from doctor to doctor, faith healer to faith healer. However, Silvino's mother died on May 7, 1930, in Tuguegarao, Cagayan, when Silvino Barsana Agudo was 13. Silvino wrote "the many years did not fade my memory of Nana's sacrifice."

Education

Silvino Barsana Agudo graduated from Cagayan National High School in Tuguegarao, Cagayan in March, 1935.

Immediately, after high school graduation Silvino's father made arrangements for him to go to Manila to pursue further studies. Before boarding the 5 seater public use (PU) car Silvino's father said, "Binong,  this is a day I will never forget; before your Nana left us, she made me promise that all of you children should study as high as you can. Now, you are going to Manila to study. To follow Bono (Silvino's older brother) who is now a lawyer in Manila." That was the last time Silvino saw his father; barely six months later, Bono came to Silvino's boarding house on Andalucia Street near back of the University of Santo Tomas to show a telegram from Batanes with news of his father's death sent from Ruring (1935).

When Silvino mentioned the death of his father to his boss, Fr. Agustin Rihuete OP, he shook Silvino's hand in condolences and gave him PHP 100 which he gave to Bono to use for funeral expenses. For nine days Silvino left work early in the afternoon to pray for Tata in the UST Chapel and then left for school in the Main Building of the University. Bono brought the rest of his siblings, Ruring, Corring, Robust, and Ramon to Manila in 1935 after their father's death.

Silvino Agudo graduated with a bachelor's degree in Commerce (which is now Business) with a major in Accounting from the University of Santo Tomas School. Silvino passed the Certified Public Accountant Exam (CPA) the following year. Silvino also graduated from University of Santo Tomas University Civil Law in 1941 and passed the Bar of the Philippines in December 2, 1941, at 27 years of age. Silvino opened his own Law & Accounting firm located the historic Calvo Building, Suite 211, 60 Escolta Street, (Binondo), Manila Published by the Philippine Yearbook 1951-1952 Edition.

Entry of Japanese into the Philippines and Batanes

Early on December 8, 1941, Atty. Silvino Barsana Agudo was in the municipality of Santa Cruz, Laguna for a court hearing regarding a boundary dispute.  While waiting for the judge at 8:00 am for trial proceeding, Atty. Silvino Barsana Agudo was informed that the judge was not coming anymore to the proceeding because the Japanese had bombarded Clark Field and Pearl Harbor.  After 9:00 am, as Atty. Silvino Barsana Agudo left court and was on his way back to Manila, he noticed that every corner of Santa Cruz had posts to recruit for volunteers to join the Philippine Armed Forces to stop the Japanese forces who were coming in from the northern city of Ligayen, Pangasinan and Tayabas, Quezon in the southern Luzon.  However, Atty. Silvino Barsana Agudo did not focus on that and proceeded to Manila, a trip that took one whole day.

When Atty. Silvino Barsana Agudo arrived at his house in P. Campa Street along España Boulevard, he found his house was filled with Ivatans.  This was because when the Japanese bombed Pearl Harbor many dormitories closed in Manila and Ivatan students remembered the Agudo family.  Atty. Silvino Barsana Agudo generously welcomed the Ivatans and assigned the girls to the upper floor and the boys on the lower floor and the Agudo sister, Aurora, prepared food for everyone.  More Ivatans from Batangas and Cavite sought refuge at the Agudo family house.  Atty. Silvino Barsana Agudo suggested for the new Ivatans who sought refuge to go to the house of Congressman Vicente Agan, Representative of Batanes; however, there was likewise no space. A messenger from Congressman Agan sent a note to the Agudo household regarding a Japanese sponsored boat that would take Ivatans back to Batanes with free passage.

Military service

During World War II, Atty. Silvino Barsana Agudo was drafted into the 7th Military Police Command. Silvino Barsana Agudo received military police training in Cavite, Rizal, and Nueva Ecija and was told his unit was to do service in Tokyo upon the surrender of the Japanese Imperial Army. However, the trip to was rescheduled by General Douglas McAurthur because of the unconditional surrender of Japan on September 3, 1945.

In the Basco Program of the Veterans Federation of the Philippines two veterans received decoration for their service. Atty. Eliseo Reyes, who at the outbreak of the war in the Pacific was a constabulary soldier in Cebu, and Atty. Silvino Barsana Agudo. Commador Geronimo Cabal and Capt. Teofilo Vatoner, the highest officers of the Batanes Veteran's Association pinned the three medals and three ribbons on Atty. Eliseo Reyes and Atty. Silvino Barsana Agudo.

Marriage and family life

Silvino Barsana Agudo married Honorata Arcilla civilly in May 1949 and formally through the Catholic Church on December 10, 1949. Silvino and Honorata had 7 children namely: Consolacion, Aurora (deceased), Pablo, Regina, Beatriz, Maria Luisa, and Luningning (deceased).

As a Lawyer

Atty. Silvino Agudo also presided as a defense lawyer in various criminal cases that made appeals in the Supreme Court of the Philippines on behalf of defendants with limited resources prosecuted for murder and rape.

Atty. Silvino Agudo's law office, Agudo, Reyes, Estrella and Associates, was located in rooms 205-208 of the Puzon Building in Quezon City (1974).

Most notably, Atty. Silvino Agudo helped establish and served as First Corporate Counsel for Cosmos Bottling Company, bottler for Pop Cola, Sarsi, and other local Philippine soft drink brands, and Leslie Corporation, manufacturer of Clover Chips and other local Philippine snack products.

Additionally, Atty. Silvino Agudo mentored rising talent, including hiring and training a young Diosdado Peralta, former Chief Justice of Supreme Court under President Rodrigo Duterte, to work in his law firm. Atty. Silvino Agudo took Diosdado Peralta, a recent University of Santo Tomas law school graduate, and assigned him to junior projects related to Cosmos Bottling company, which Silvino helped establish.

Nominations for Governor of Batanes 

As the 1967 mid-election approached President Ferdinand Marcos moved to ensure that his Nacionalista Party would be victorious by electing most of the Senators, Governors, and Mayors of the country. President Ferdinand Marcos asked Chairman Manuel "Maning" Agudo to choose Silvino Barsana Agudo as candidate for Governor who will most likely win in Batanes.  Manuel Agudo's reputation was critically important to Silvino Barsana Agudo's endorsement to run for Governor of Batanes because of his Chairmanship of the Civil Service Board of Appeals, tenure as Congressman of Batanes (1958–1961), and service as administrative officer in the Office of the President in Malacañang Palace during the tenure of six Presidents of the Philippines, namely: José P. Laurel, Sergio Osmeña, Manuel Roxas, Elpidio Quirino, Ramon Magsaysay, and Carlos P. Garcia.

During this time Silvino Barsana Agudo was a successful law practitioner with many clients in the Filipino, American, Spanish, and Chinese communities. Precisely because of his success in law practice Silvino Barasana Agudo was induced to run for Governor of Batanes. Silvino Barsana Agudo agreed to participate in the Provincial Convention in Batanes and then boarded a Philippine Navy boat to Basco in the month of August 1967.

Silvino Barsana Agudo's trip was delayed by a typhoon but when he arrived in Basco, the town was as he described it a "gog." Manuel and Renee Agudo rented a house to stay and Silvino Barsana Agudo stayed in the house of his Uncle, Jose Barona, and Auntie Bilay (Severa) Barsana Barona, sister of Silvino's mother. On the night of his arrival the Batanes Veteran Association, a Chapter of the Veterans Association of the Philippines, had a program in the High School auditorium in which Silvino Barsana Agudo was recognized as a Veteran of World War II by the highest-ranking officers of the Batanes Veteran's Association.

Two days after Atty. Silvino Barsana Agudo arrived in Basco, the Nacionalista Party Convention was held on top Tukon Hill. There was a band to render music while waiting for the delegates from each town: Basco, Itbayat, Mahatao, Uyugan, and Sabtang. When all the delegates arrived, nominations were made and three were nominated for Governor: Jose Aceron of Ivana, Tobias Abad of Basco, and Atty. Silvino Barsana Agudo of Ivana. After the nominations, Jose Martinez, Atty. Silvino Barsana Agudo's campaign manager, talked to delegates in each town without consulting Atty. Silvino Barsana Agudo. After the short campaigning, voting was done by secret ballot.

At the end of the day, Mrs. Renee Agudo, Chairwoman of the Batanes Nacionalista Party announced the winning party candidates:
Governor: Atty. Silvino B. Agudo; 
Vice Governor: Tobais Abad; 
Board Members (2): Emmanuel Aguasha of Mahatao and Francisco Bidayan of Basco

After the convention all the official candidates took the same Philippine Navy Boat back to Manila.

Mrs. Renee Agudo reported to President Ferdinand Marcos and Senator Gil Puyat the official candidates for the Nacionalista Party in Batanes. Within one month President Ferdinand Marcos invited all the candidates for governor and city mayor to Malacañang Palace for individual conversations with the President. To everyone's surprise, President Marcos knew all candidates' names by heart. All candidates were also brought into a room filled with 6-foot piles of legal-sized brown envelopes. The President's aid gave one envelope to each candidate. However, Atty. Silvino Barsana Agudo was pulled aside and given a second envelope which was to be for the six candidates for mayor in the Province. Atty. Silvino Barsana Agudo took a taxi home and examined the contents of the brown envelopes – each containing US$10,000 in $10 bills or $20,000 in all. In remembrance of President, Atty, Silvino Barsana Agudo bought a new refrigerator to change the old fridge. The rest of the money was distributed and spent for provisions to the Batanes campaign.

As Governor of Batanes 

During his term (1968–1971), Governor Silvino Barsana Agudo supported the preservation and promotion of Batanes culture through various initiatives including research of archaic Itbayaten numeral writing systems.

Suzuki Boys 

Governor Silvino Barsana Agudo presided over Batanes during one of the province's most tumultuous times and played an instrumental role in preventing election fraud in Batanes and protecting Ivatan people from armed thugs known as Suzuki Boys for the branded motorcycles used a vehicles of suppression. To this day in Batanes, political elections for the most part are different than many other provinces in Philippines - peaceful, festive, and a time of friendly encounters of opposing candidates and camps. However, this section is of particular importance as it will help document one of the darkest and unique events in Batanes' history. The takeover of the Batanes by the Suzuki thugs is a classic example of a swift coup of isolating an island group from the rest of the country. The Batanes Islands were cut off from airline flights and from telephone and telegraph communications.

There were five candidates for the lone congressional seat of the province in 1969.

The important candidates were:

- Mrs. Renee Agudo (NP)

- former Congressmen Jorge Abad (father of Department of Budget and Management Secretary Florencio Abad)

- Rufino Antonio Jr. (Independent-NP; Businessman from Metro Manila who opened a Suzuki brand motorcycle dealership)

Weeks before the November 11, 1969 Elections, about 100 strange faces (non-Ivatans) landed in Basco and scattered in the six towns of the province. Crates also landed in Basco. In late October, as an effort to maintain security of the island, Governor Silvino Agudo instructed Provincial Commander (PC), Captain Fulgencio Albano, to collect licensed firearms from the residents "for verification." Furthermore, Governor Silvino Barsana Agudo advised Provincial Command soldiers to meet Philippine Airline (PAL) Flights on October 26, 28 and November 2, 4, and 6 to Basco to search landing passengers and their luggage for firearms.

On November 9, PAL suspended flights to Basco because of man-caused obstructions in the runway. A number of privately owned planes, including light aircraft including a helicopter and Douglas DC-3 blocked Basco's runway. The PAL plane that carried Ivatan voters from Manila had to turn back.

On November 10, a day before the elections, telegraph communications from Basco through the Bureau of Telecommunications and Station and Radio Communications of the Philippines Incorporated (RCPI) subsequently went dead. Armed goons had allegedly destroyed all private and government wireless facilities and drove away operators of the telcom and RCPI stations; an operator of the weather bureau was reportedly tear gassed. The equipment was destroyed, however, some operators who fled to the mountains used a transmitter to report "goon activities" and request the Provincial Commander Fulgencio Albano and President Ferdinand Marcos for aid. Later during the night of November 10, the Bureau of Public Highways compound was raided and vehicles were destroyed.

Even before this, on October 24, Ivatans in Manila held a meeting at D & E Restaurant in Quezon City and decided to ask Provincial Command and Comelec to relieve Captain Fulgencio Albano of Batanes Provincial Command. On November 2, Major Benjamin Amante became the new Batanes PC Commander. On November 7, Major Amante and Representative Roque Ablan (Ilocos Norte) flew to Basco in Ablan's plane. Major Amante stayed only a few days then left Basco before elections. The PC Officer in charge was Captain Velasco.

On election day November 11, 1969, the roads leading to the six towns of Batanes were barricaded by checkpoints manned by armed thugs. Governor Agudo and his party making tours of the towns were turned back at one of the checkpoints and warned if they proceeded they might be ambushed. An American Peace Corps Volunteer, Larry Jones, was given six hours to surrender photographs of goons terrorizing voters at precincts.

Three days after the elections, Batanes was one of the few provinces from which results of the congressional elections were not heard. In the past elections, which were peaceful, results were known by the next day, there being only less than 5,000 votes to count. In Manila, Governor Silvino Agudo's wife, Honorata Agudo, asked Executive Secretary Ernesto Maceda to assign security men to her house near Quezon City because suspicious looking men were loitering near their home.

In less than a week after the November 11, 1969 Congressional Elections, Ivatans, the residents of Batanes, were up in arms against the takeover of their islands by gangster-rule during the elections. Reports of the terror that gripped Batanes province have filtered to Manila only several days after the elections, and there was nothing they could do to change the results. All they could do was call public attention to the "rape of the ballot" in their province. Their grievances were not the sour grapes of defeated politicians. They come from plain citizens talking not as NPs or LPs but, as outraged citizens who were robbed of their right to vote at gunpoint [This excerpt also takes into account inputs from Bill Barsana and Celerina Navarro].

On January 16, 1969, President Ferdinand Marcos acknowledged a report from Governor Silvino Agudo stating "three of the suspected malefactors in connection with the November 11 polls had escaped by private plane (Official Gazette of the Republic of the Philippines)."

Batanes Bicentennial Commission

Gov. Silvino Barsana Agudo remained active in provincial affairs into his retired days as President of the Batanes Bicentennial Commission in 1983.

In May 1983, on the initiative of the Dominican Fathers in Santo Domingo Church in Quezon City, a Bicentennial Commission was created to plan the celebration of the 200th Anniversary of the Christianization of Batanes and establishment of a centralized civil government therein. (In 1773, two missionaries from the Dominican Order from Tuguegarao, Cagayan landed in Ivana, Batanes and stayed to put up their church. Ten years later in June 1783, the Civil Government was established in Basco, Batanes)

The Bicentennial Commission was composed of Ivatans from Manila environs invited by the Santo Domingo Fathers. The Fathers consulted Engineer Anastacio Agan, former Congressmen from Batanes and at that time incumbent Quezon City Engineer.  Congressmen Agan was also the structural engineer who built the Santo Domingo Church on Quezon Avenue in Quezon City. He was assisted in the job of construction of the Santo Domingo Church by Engineer Ruperto Agudo.

The assembly of Ivatans who were invited to form the Commission elected the following officers: President, Ex-Governor Silvino B. Agudo; Vice President and Chairman of the Committee on Public Information, Dr. Florentino H. Hornedo; Secretary, Fr. Alfonso Loreto, O.P.; Treasurer, Rev. Fr. Rey Adadlid, O.P.; Committee of Ways and Means: Chairman-Dr. Francisco Roman; Co-Chairman Mrs. Josefina Castro-Valera. Members were Mrs. Rucela Barsana Acacio, Mrs. Ana G. Agagan; Atty. Antonio Alcantara, Sor. Pia Alcazar, O.P., Captain Pedro Doplito, Atty. Carlos Castano, Bro. N. Comaya, O.P. Captain Pedro Doplito, Atty. Antonio Escalante; Mrs. Agapita Fagar, Fr. Ermito De Sagun, O.P., and Mrs. Eutropia Hornedo-Silvestre.

The Bicentennial Anniversary was celebrated in two places, one in the Aquinas School at Sanctuario de Sto. Cristo at Blumentritt Road, San Juan Del Monte, Metro Manila and the other was held in Basco, Batanes under the joint auspices of the Provincial Government and the Bishop of Batanes Msgr. Mario Baltazar O.P. Silvino Agudo, as President of the Commission lead both occasions.

YouTube hit success

At the age of 91, Silvino Barsana Agudo's folk renditions has gained the attention from the Ivatan diaspora.

Death

Governor Silvino Barsana Agudo died at the age of 93 years old on December 17, 2010, in Sacramento, California. His daughters Gina, Lulu, and grandson, Patrick, were by his side.

Governor Silvino Barsana Agudo is buried with his wife Honorata and daughter Nining at St. Mary Cemetery and Funeral Center in Sacramento, California.

References

1917 births
2010 deaths
Governors of Batanes
21st-century Filipino businesspeople
20th-century Filipino lawyers
Philippine Army personnel
Filipino military personnel of World War II
21st-century Filipino politicians
People from Batanes
People from Tuguegarao
University of Santo Tomas alumni